Capua vulgana is a moth of the family Tortricidae found in Asia and Europe. It was first described by the German entomologist Josef Aloys Frölich in 1828.

Distribution
This species can be found from Ireland and Great Britain, east through the Benelux, Fennoscandia and central and south-eastern Europe to Siberia and Sakhalin to the Kuriles. It is also found in China (Heilongjiang, Inner Mongolia, Jilin, Sichuan, Shandong) and Taiwan.

Habitat
These rather common moths mainly inhabit in woodlands, in open scrubs and in deciduous forests.

Description
The wingspan of Capua vulgana can reach 13–19 mm. These broad-winged Tortrix moths have a buff-coloured head and pale brown forewings with dark brown markings. Males are more well-marked than the females.

Biology
It is a univoltine species. Adults are on wing from May to June and can be found flying at dusk. The larvae feed on the leaves of a wide range of woodland trees and plants, including alder (Alnus glutinosa), hazel (Corylus avellana), rowan (Sorbus aucuparia), pedunculate oak (Quercus robur) and bilberry (Vaccinium myrtillus).

References

External links
 Lepiforum
 Naturhistoriska risksmuseet
 Nature Spot

vulgana
Moths described in 1828
Moths of Asia
Tortricidae of Europe